Joan Elizabeth Higginbotham (born August 3, 1964) is an electrical engineer and a former NASA astronaut. She flew aboard Space Shuttle Discovery mission STS-116 as a mission specialist and is the third African American woman to go into space, after Mae Jemison and Stephanie Wilson.

Early life and education
Higginbotham was born in Chicago, Illinois, and attended Whitney Young Magnet High School, graduating in 1982. She received a Bachelor of Science degree from the Southern Illinois University Carbondale in 1987, and a master's in management science (1992) and in space systems (1996) both from the Florida Institute of Technology.

Higginbotham is a member of Delta Sigma Theta Sorority and The Links, Incorporated.

Career

NASA

Higginbotham began her career in 1987, two weeks after getting her Bachelor of Science degree, at the Kennedy Space Center (KSC), Florida, as a Payload Electrical Engineer in the Electrical and Telecommunications Systems Division. Within six months she became the lead for the Orbiter Experiments (OEX) on OV-102, the Space Shuttle Columbia. She later worked on the Shuttle payload bay reconfiguration for all Shuttle missions and conducted electrical compatibility tests for all payloads flown aboard the Shuttle. She was also tasked by KSC management to undertake several special assignments where she served as the Executive Staff Assistant to the Director of Shuttle Operations and Management, led a team of engineers in performing critical analysis for the Space Shuttle flow in support of a simulation model tool, and worked on an interactive display detailing the Space Shuttle processing procedures at Spaceport United States (Kennedy Space Center's Visitors Center). Higginbotham then served as backup orbiter project engineer for OV-104, Space Shuttle Atlantis, where she participated in the integration of the orbiter docking station (ODS) into the space shuttle used during Shuttle/Mir docking missions. Two years later, she was promoted to lead orbiter project engineer for OV-102, Space Shuttle Columbia. In this position, she held the technical lead government engineering position in the firing room where she supported and managed the integration of vehicle testing and troubleshooting. She actively participated in 53 space shuttle launches during her 9-year tenure at Kennedy Space Center.

Selected as an astronaut candidate by NASA in April 1996, Higginbotham reported to the Johnson Space Center in August 1996. Since that time, she had been assigned technical duties in the Payloads & Habitability Branch, the Shuttle Avionics & Integration Laboratory (SAIL), the Kennedy Space Center (KSC) Operations (Ops) Support Branch, where she tested various modules of the International Space Station for operability, compatibility, and functionality prior to launch, the Astronaut Office CAPCOM (Capsule Communicator) Branch in the startup and support of numerous space station missions and space shuttle missions, the Robotics Branch, and Lead for the International Space Station Systems Crew Interfaces Section.

Higginbotham logged over 308 hours in space during her mission with the crew of STS-116 where her primary task was to operate the Space Station Remote Manipulator System (SSRMS). Higginbotham took a scarf for the Houston Dynamo on board with her during her mission.

Higginbotham was originally assigned to the crew of STS-126 targeted for launch in September 2008. On November 21, 2007, NASA announced  a change in the crew manifest, due to Higginbotham's decision to leave NASA to take a job in the private sector. Donald Pettit replaced Higginbotham for STS-126.

Awards and honors
In 2007, Higginbotham received the Adler Planetarium Women in Space Science Award.

 Group Award for achievements related to the flight of the STS-26 (the first shuttle flight after the Challenger disaster)
 Commendation of Merit for Service to the Department of Defense Missions 
 The Mecklenburg Times (2014) 50 Most Influential Women
 World Who's Who of Women 
 Black Rose Award (2007) awarded by the (League of Black Women)
 Honorary Doctor of Aerospace Science (2016) awarded by the Southern Illinois University at Carbondale
 Honorary Doctor of Humane Letters (2017) awarded by the University of New Orleans
 Featured speaker at TEDxBermuda
 2008 Featured in PBS special, “Bold Visions: Women in Science & Technology”

See also
 List of African-American astronauts

External links
 Official NASA bio

References

1964 births
Florida Institute of Technology alumni
Living people
Women astronauts
People from Chicago
Whitney M. Young Magnet High School alumni
African-American women engineers
American women engineers
African-American engineers
Recipients of the NASA Exceptional Service Medal
NASA civilian astronauts
Delta Sigma Theta members
African-American women aviators
American women aviators
African-American aviators
Space Shuttle program astronauts
Engineers from Illinois
21st-century African-American people
21st-century African-American women
20th-century African-American people
20th-century African-American women